In mathematics, the  theorem of Gromov and Thurston states a sufficient condition for Dehn filling on a cusped hyperbolic 3-manifold to result in a negatively curved 3-manifold.  

Let  be a cusped hyperbolic 3-manifold. Disjoint horoball neighborhoods of each cusp can be selected. The boundaries of these neighborhoods are quotients of horospheres and thus have Euclidean metrics. A slope, i.e. unoriented isotopy class of simple closed curves on these boundaries, thus has a well-defined length by taking the minimal Euclidean length over all curves in the isotopy class. In fact, this metric can be selected to be identical to the original hyperbolic metric outside the horoball neighborhoods. 

The basic idea of the proof is to explicitly construct a negatively curved metric inside each horoball neighborhood that matches the metric near the horospherical boundary.  This construction, using cylindrical coordinates, works when the filling slope is greater than .  See  for complete details.

According to the geometrization conjecture, these negatively curved 3-manifolds must actually admit a complete hyperbolic metric.  A horoball packing argument due to Thurston shows that there are at most 48 slopes to avoid on each cusp to get a hyperbolic 3-manifold.  For one-cusped hyperbolic 3-manifolds, an improvement due to Colin Adams gives 24 exceptional slopes.    

The "6 theorem" states that Dehn filling along slopes of length greater than 6 results in a hyperbolike 3-manifold, i.e. an irreducible, atoroidal, non-Seifert-fibered 3-manifold with infinite word hyperbolic fundamental group. Yet again assuming the geometrization conjecture, these manifolds have a complete hyperbolic metric. An argument of Agol's shows that there are at most 12 exceptional slopes.

References
.
.
.

3-manifolds
Theorems in geometry